Lamir or Lemir or Lomir may refer to:
 Lamir, Ardabil
 Lemir, Ardabil
 Lamir, Talesh, Gilan Province
 Lamir-e Sofla, Asalem District, Talesh County, Gilan Province
 Lemir, Haviq, Talesh County, Gilan Province